Sis Ram Ola (30 July 1927 – 15 December 2013) was a member of the 15th Lok Sabha of India. He represented the Jhunjhunu constituency of Rajasthan and was a member of the Indian National Congress.

He was a member of the Rajasthan Legislative Assembly from 1957 to 1990, and from 1980 to 1990 he was a cabinet minister in the Government of Rajasthan. From 1993 to 1996, he was again a Member of the Rajasthan Legislative Assembly. In 1996, he was elected to the 11th Lok Sabha; he was Union Minister of State for Chemicals and Fertilizers (Independent Charge) from 1996 to 1997 and Union Minister of State for Water Resources (Independent Charge) from 1997 to 1998. He was re-elected to the 12th Lok Sabha in 1998, the 13th Lok Sabha in 1999, the 14th Lok Sabha in 2004, and the 15th Lok Sabha in 2009. He was also jila pramukh of Jhujhunu and his son Bijender Ola is a MLA from Jhunjhunu and was a former minister in the Rajasthan government.

Sis Ram Ola was the recipient of the Padma Shri award in 1968 for social work. Started girls education in a remote area in rural Rajasthan with three girls in the school known as Indira Gandhi Balika Niketan Ardawata in 1952; as a result of his efforts since 1952, brought Jhunjhunu district to third place in literacy (in Rajasthan) according to 2011 census.
Sis Ram Ola died in Medanta Hospital, Gurgoan on 15 December 2013 because of cardiac arrest. He had been admitted in a Gurgaon hospital with a cardiac complaint. Positions Held
1957-1990 and 1993-96 Member, Rajasthan Legislative Assembly
1980-1990 Cabinet Minister, Government of Rajasthan for ten years (incharge of Panchayati Raj, Rural Development, Forest and Environment, Public Health, Engineering Department, Irrigation, Transport, Co-operatives, Excise, Under-ground Water and Soldiers` Welfare)
1960-77 Zila Pramukh, Jhunjhunu, Rajasthan
1960-95 Member, Rajasthan Pradesh Congress Committee (P.C.C.),
Member, Executive Committee, R.P.C.C.,
, Kisan Cell, R.P.C.C., Rajasthan
Treasurer, P.C.C., Rajasthan
Member, Pradesh Congress Election Committee
Member, Executive, Congress Legislative Party, Rajasthan Legislative Assembly
1972 onwards Member, All India Congress Committee (A.I.C.C.)
1996 Elected to 11th Lok Sabha
1996-97 Union Minister of State, Chemicals and Fertilizers (Independent Charge)
1997-98 Union Minister of State, Water Resources (Independent Charge)
1998 Re-elected to 12th Lok Sabha (2nd term)
1998-99 Member, Committee on Commerce and its Sub-Committee on Textiles
Member, Joint Committee on Salaries and Allowances of Members of Parliament
Member, Consultative Committee, Ministry of Defence
1999 Re-elected to 13th Lok Sabha (3rd term)
1999-2004 Member, Committee on Petitions
Member, Committee on Members of Parliament Local Area Development Scheme
Member, Committee on Food, Civil Supplies and Public Distribution
2004 Elected to 14th Lok Sabha (4th term)
2009 elected to 15th Lok Sabha (5th Term)
23 May 2004-27 Nov. 2004 Union Cabinet Minister, Labour and Employment
27 Nov. 2004 onwards Union Cabinet Minister, Mines
2009: Elected Congress MP from Jhunjhunu
June 17, 2013 : sworn as Cabinet Minister for Labour.

References

|-

1927 births
2013 deaths
Indian National Congress politicians from Rajasthan
India MPs 2009–2014
Recipients of the Padma Shri in social work
Rajasthani people
People from Jhunjhunu district
India MPs 1996–1997
India MPs 1998–1999
India MPs 1999–2004
India MPs 2004–2009
Lok Sabha members from Rajasthan
All India Indira Congress (Tiwari) politicians
Social workers
20th-century Indian educators
Social workers from Rajasthan
Mining ministers of India
Labour ministers of India
Members of the Cabinet of India